San Fernando is the northern quarter of Maspalomas in the municipality of San Bartolomé de Tirajana, Gran Canaria, and as well the name of the parish for all of Maspalomas. The patron saint San Fernando (Saint Ferdinand) was a king of Castile and famous for successful re-Christianization (the Reconquista) after the Islamic conquest of Hispania in 710.

The quarter of San Fernando
The district of San Fernando was built from the 1970s for civil servants and people working in the tourist industry. It is delimited by the old main road, GC-500, to the south and by its successor, the GC-1 motorway, to the north. In the east and the west San Fernando is enclosed by gullies.

Due to its larger resident population, San Fernando has become the site for municipal service, including sport facilities, a municipal library, and a fire station. In its eastern part several large supermarkets are situated.

Tourism
San Fernando is not the typical destination for tourists, although Playa del Inglés is within walking distance. The parochial church, a municipal market and the bi-weekly agricultural market are the main attractions. The main street Avenída de Galdar in the east of San Fernando was refurbished in 2014. There shops, restaurants and cafés cater to tourists arriving on foot or by taxi.

The parish of San Fernando

The parish of San Fernando covers the southern part of the municipality San Bartolomé de Tirajana, including all of Maspalomas, and was established in 1982.

References

Populated places in Gran Canaria